The 1965 Titleholders Championship was the 26th Titleholders Championship, held November 25–28 at Augusta Country Club in Augusta, Georgia. Kathy Whitworth, age 26, won the first of her six major titles, ten strokes ahead of runner-up Peggy Wilson, with defending champion Marilynn Smith a stroke back in third place.

With a 287 (−1), Whitworth broke the 72-hole scoring record by two strokes, set by Smith the previous year. It was her 19th victory on the LPGA Tour and eighth of the 1965 season.

The previous editions had been played in late April; this year's championship was moved to late November, played over the Thanksgiving weekend and the last event of the 1965 season.

Whitworth had five-stroke leads after 36 holes at 142 (−2), and after 54 holes at 216 (even).

Final leaderboard
Sunday, November 28, 1965

Source:

References

Titleholders Championship
Golf in Georgia (U.S. state)
Titleholders Championship
Titleholders Championship
Titleholders Championship
Titleholders Championship
Women's sports in Georgia (U.S. state)